The 2015–16 Ligat Nashim was the 18th season of women's league football under the Israeli Football Association. First division matches were due to begin on 3 November 2015, but were delayed to start on 10 November. The defending champions are ASA Tel Aviv University, having won the title the previous season.

On 22 May 2016, in the penultimate match of the season, F.C. Ramat HaSharon secured the title, Its first ever, by defeating title rival F.C. Kiryat Gat 1–0. By winning, FC Ramat HaSharon qualified to 2016–17 UEFA Women's Champions League. At the bottom, Maccabi Be'er Sheva was relegated to Ligat Nashim Shniya.

In the second division, Bnot Netanya F.C. won the league and was promoted to the top division.

Ligat Nashim Rishona

Regular season
Teams play 16 matches in the regular season.

Championship group
Teams play eight more games, for a total of 24.

Relegation group

Top scorers

Ligat Nashim Shniya

As 5 teams registered to the second division, the participating clubs play each of their opponents four times for a total of 16 matches for each club. At the end of the season, the top placed team will be promoted to the top division.

League table

Results

Rounds 1-10

Rounds 11-20

Top scorers

References

External links
Ligat Nashim Rishona @IFA
Ligat Nashim Shniya @IFA

Ligat Nashim seasons
1
women
Israel